Swissair Flight 111 was a scheduled international passenger flight from John F. Kennedy International Airport in New York City, United States, to Cointrin Airport in Geneva, Switzerland. This flight was also a codeshare flight with Delta Air Lines. On 2 September 1998, the McDonnell Douglas MD-11 performing this flight, registration HB-IWF, crashed into the Atlantic Ocean southwest of Halifax Stanfield International Airport at the entrance to St. Margarets Bay, Nova Scotia. All 229 passengers and crew on board the MD-11 were killed, making the crash the deadliest accident in the history of Swissair and the deadliest accident involving McDonnell Douglas MD-11.

The search and rescue response, crash recovery operation, and investigation by the Government of Canada took more than four years and cost CA$57 million. The investigation carried out by the Transportation Safety Board of Canada (TSB) concluded that flammable material used in the aircraft's structure allowed a fire to spread beyond the control of the crew, resulting in the crash of the aircraft. Several wide-ranging recommendations were made which were incorporated into newer US Federal Aviation Administration standards.

Swissair Flight 111 was one of the two ill-fated flights known as the "UN shuttle" (the other being Ethiopian Airlines Flight 302 in 2019) because of its popularity with United Nations officials traveling between the organization's two biggest centers. The flight also carried business executives, scientists, and researchers.

Aircraft and crew 
The aircraft, a seven-year-old McDonnell Douglas MD-11, serial number 48448, registration HB-IWF, was manufactured in 1991, and Swissair was its only operator. It bore the title of Vaud, in honor of the Swiss canton of the same name. The cabin was configured with 241 passenger seats. First and business class seats were equipped with in-seat in-flight entertainment (IFE) systems from Interactive Flight Technologies. The aircraft was powered by three Pratt & Whitney PW4462 turbofan engines and had logged over 36,000 hours before the crash.

The in-flight entertainment system was the first of its kind equipped on the plane. It allowed the first and business class passengers to browse the World Wide Web, select their own movies and games, and gamble. The system was installed in business class one year before the incident, between 21 August and 9 September 1997. It was installed in first class five months later, in February 1998, due to delivery delays.

The pilot-in-command was 50-year-old Urs Zimmermann. At the time of the accident, he had approximately 10,800 hours of total flying time, of which 900 hours were in an MD-11. He was also an instructor pilot for the MD-11. Before his career with Swissair, he was a fighter pilot in the Swiss Air Force from 1966 to 1970. Zimmermann was described as a friendly person with professional skills, who always worked with exactness and precision.

The first officer, 36-year-old Stefan Löw, had approximately 4,800 hours of total flying time, including 230 hours on the MD-11. He was an instructor on the MD-80 and A320. From 1982 to 1990, he had been a pilot in the Swiss Air Force.
The cabin crew comprised a maître de cabine (purser) and eleven flight attendants. All crew members on board Swissair Flight 111 were qualified, certified, and trained in accordance with Swiss regulations under the Joint Aviation Authorities (JAA).

Flight timeline 

The flight took off from New York's John F. Kennedy International Airport at 20:18 EDT (00:18 UTC) on 2 September. From 20:33 – 20:47 EDT (00:33 to 00:47 UTC), the aircraft experienced a radio blackout for approximately thirteen minutes, which was later found to be caused by communication radio tuning errors.

At 22:10 AT (01:10 UTC, 52 minutes after takeoff), the flight crew detected an odour in the cockpit and determined it to be smoke from the air conditioning system. Four minutes later, the odour returned and smoke became visible, prompting the pilots to make a "pan-pan" radio call to Moncton air traffic control, the area control center (ACC) station in charge of air traffic over the Canadian province of Nova Scotia. The pan-pan call indicated that there was an urgency due to smoke in the cockpit but did not declare an emergency as denoted by a "mayday" call.

At 22:18 AT (01:18 UTC), Moncton Centre handed over traffic control of the plane to Halifax terminal air traffic control, the ATC station in charge of controlling traffic in and out of Halifax International Airport. The crew then requested to dump fuel to reduce their weight for landing. Halifax thus vectored the plane south toward St. Margaret's Bay where it was safe for the aircraft to dump fuel while remaining within  of the airport.

In accordance with the Swissair checklist "In case of smoke of unknown origin", the crew shut off power to the cabin, which also turned off the recirculating fans in the cabin's ceiling. This allowed the fire to spread to the cockpit, eventually shutting off power to the aircraft's autopilot. At 22:24:28 AT (01:24:28 UTC), the crew informed Halifax that "we now must fly manually", followed by declaring an emergency. Ten seconds later, the crew declared an emergency again, saying "...and we are declaring emergency now, Swissair one eleven"; this was the last transmission received from Flight 111.

The aircraft flight data recorder stopped operating at 22:25:40 AT (01:25:40 UTC), followed one second later by the cockpit voice recorder. After this, the aircraft could only be tracked through primary radar, which does not provide altitude information.

The collision with the water decelerated the aircraft with approximately 350 g, causing it to disintegrate instantly. The location of the crash was identified as approximately 44°24′33″N 63°58′25″W.

Victims
   
There were 132 American (including one employee each from Delta Air Lines and United Airlines), 41 Swiss (including the 13 crew members), 30 French, three British, four Canadian, three Italian, two Greek, two Lebanese, one each from Afghanistan, China, Germany, India, Iran, Russia, Saudi Arabia, Spain, St. Kitts and Nevis, Mexico, Sweden, and Yugoslavia, and four other passengers on board.

Jonathan Mann, former head of the World Health Organization's AIDS program, and his wife, AIDS researcher Mary Lou Clements-Mann, died in the crash.

Joseph LaMotta, son of boxing legend Jake LaMotta, also perished in the crash. The LaMotta family later sued the airline for his death.

Post-crash response

Search and rescue operation 
The search and rescue (SAR) operation was code-named Operation Persistence and was launched immediately by Joint Rescue Coordination Centre Halifax (JRCC Halifax), which tasked the Air Command, Maritime Command and Land Force Command of the Canadian Forces (CF), Canadian Coast Guard (CCG) and Canadian Coast Guard Auxiliary (CCGA) resources.

The first rescue resources to approach the crash site were CCGA volunteer units, which were mostly privately owned fishing boats operating from Peggy's Cove and Bayswater, as well as other harbours on St. Margaret's Bay and the Aspotogan Peninsula. They were soon joined by the dedicated CCG SAR vessel, CCGS Sambro; CH-124 Sea King helicopters, flown from CFB Shearwater by crews from 423 Maritime Helicopter Squadron (MHS) and 406 Maritime Operational Training Squadron (MOTS); and CH-113 Labrador SAR helicopters flown from CFB Greenwood by the 413 Transport and Rescue Squadron (TRS). and CP-140 Aurora aircraft from CFB Greenwood from 405 Long Range Patrol Squadron.

The crash site's proximity to Halifax placed it within one hour's sailing time of ships docked at Canada's largest naval base, CFB Halifax, and one of the largest CCG bases in Canada, the CCG Regional Headquarters in Dartmouth. Calls went out immediately and ships sailed directly to St. Margaret's Bay.

The provincial ambulance service, Emergency Health Services (EHS), received word of the crash at 22:39 AT, and ordered 21 emergency units from Halifax, the South Shore, and the Annapolis Valley to respond. An EHS helicopter was also sent to the crash site, and the Queen Elizabeth II Health Sciences Centre in Halifax was put on emergency alert. The emergency health services were stood down around 3:30 AT the next morning, as expectations of finding survivors diminished.

The land search, including shoreline searching, was the responsibility of Halifax Regional Search and Rescue. The organization was responsible for all ground operations including military operations and other ground search and rescue teams.

Search and recovery operation 
By the afternoon of 3 September, it was apparent that there were no survivors from the crash and JRCC Halifax de-tasked dedicated SAR assets (CCGS Sambro and the CH-113 Labrador helicopters). The Royal Canadian Mounted Police were given overall command of the recovery operation, with HMCS Preserver remaining on-scene commander.

The aircraft broke up on impact with the water and most of the debris sank to the ocean floor (a depth of ). Some debris was found floating in the crash area and over the following weeks debris washed up on the nearby shorelines.

The initial focus of the recovery was on finding and identifying human remains and on recovering the flight recorders. As the force of impact was "in the order of at least 350 g", the aircraft was fragmented and the environmental conditions only allowed the recovery of human remains along with the aircraft wreckage.
Only one of the victims was visually identifiable. Eventually, 147 were identified by fingerprint, dental records, and X-ray comparisons. The remaining 81 were identified through DNA tests.

With CF divers (navy clearance divers, port inspection divers, ship's team divers, and Army combat divers) working on the recovery, a request was made by the Government of Canada to the Government of the United States for a larger dedicated salvage recovery vessel.  was tasked to the recovery effort, arriving from Philadelphia on 9 September. Among Grapples crew were 32 salvage divers. Additionally, the USS Grapple welcomed two teams of Canadian Navy Clearance Divers that flew across Canada from Fleet Diving Unit (FDU) Pacific.

The cockpit voice recorder (CVR) and flight data recorder (FDR) were found by the submarine HMCS Okanagan using sonar to detect the underwater locator beacon signals and were quickly retrieved by Canadian Navy divers (the FDR on 6 September and the CVR on 11 September 1998).

The recovery operation was guided by the TSB with resources from the Canadian Forces, Canadian Coast Guard, Royal Canadian Mounted Police, and other agencies. The area was surveyed using route survey sonar, laser line scanners, and remotely operated vehicles (ROVs) to locate items. After being located, the debris was then recovered (initially by divers and ROVs, later by dredging and trawling).

On 2 October 1998, the TSB initiated a heavy lift operation to retrieve the major portion of the wreckage from the deep water before the expected winter storms began. By 21 October, an estimated 27% of the wreckage was recovered. At that point in the investigation, the crash was generally believed to have been caused by faulty wiring in the cockpit after the IFE system started to overheat. The TSB released its preliminary report on 30 August 2000 and the final report in 2003.

The final phase of wreckage recovery employed the ship  to dredge the remaining aircraft debris.

Response to victims' families and friends 
JFK Airport used the JFK Ramada Plaza Hotel to house relatives and friends of the victims of the crash, due to the hotel's central location relative to the airport. Jerome Hauer, the head of the emergency management task force of New York City, praised the swift actions of Swissair and codeshare partner Delta Air Lines in responding to the accident; he had criticized Trans World Airlines in its response to the TWA Flight 800 crash in 1996.

Investigation

Identification of victims 
The RCMP medical examiners positively identified most of the bodies within ten weeks of the accident. Due to extreme impact forces, only one body was identifiable by sight. DNA profiling was used to identify approximately one hundred bodies, in what has been referred to as "the largest DNA identification project ever undertaken in Canada". The RCMP contacted relatives of victims to request medical histories and dental records. They were also asked to provide blood samples for genetic matching in the DNA identification of the victims. About 90 bodies were identified by the medical examiners using dental records; owing to the large number of ante-mortem (before death) dental X-rays available to the examiners, these bodies were identified by late October 1998. Fingerprints and ante-mortem X-rays were used to identify around 30 bodies.

Examination of wreckage 

An estimated 2 million pieces of debris were recovered and brought ashore for inspection at a secure handling facility in a marine industrial park at Sheet Harbour, where small material was hand inspected by teams of RCMP officers looking for human remains, personal effects, and valuables from the aircraft's cargo hold. The material was then transported to CFB Shearwater, where it was sorted and inspected by over 350 investigators from multiple organizations and companies, including the Transportation Safety Board of Canada (TSB), the US National Transportation Safety Board, the US Federal Aviation Administration, the Swiss Aircraft Accident Investigation Bureau, Boeing, Pratt & Whitney, Air Line Pilots Association, and Swissair.

As each piece of wreckage was brought in, it was carefully cleaned with fresh water, sorted, and weighed. The item was then placed in a specific area of a hangar at CFB Shearwater, based on a grid system representing the various sections of the plane. All items not considered significant to the crash were stored with similar items in large boxes. When a box was full, it was weighed and moved to a custom-built temporary structure (J-Hangar) on a discontinued runway for long-term storage. If deemed significant to the investigation, the item was documented, photographed, and kept in the active examination hangar. Particular attention was paid to any item showing heat damage, burns, or other unusual marks. The front  of the aircraft, from the front of the cockpit to near the front of the first-class passenger cabin, was reconstructed. Information gained by this allowed investigators to determine the severity and limits of the fire damage, its possible origins, and progression.

The lack of flight recorder data for the last six minutes of the flight added significant complexity to the investigation and was a major factor in its lengthy duration. The TSB team had to reconstruct the last six minutes of flight entirely from the physical evidence. The investigation became the largest and most expensive transport accident investigation in Canadian history, costing CA$57 million (US$48.5 million) over five years.

Cockpit recordings 

The cockpit voice recorder used a  recording tape that operated on a 30-minute loop. It therefore retained only that half-hour of the flight before the recorders failed, six minutes before the crash. The CVR recording and transcript were covered by a strict privilege under section 28 of the Canadian Transportation Accident Investigation and Safety Board Act and thus were not publicly disclosed, although the air traffic control recordings are less strictly privileged: section 29 of the same act provides only that they may not be used in certain legal proceedings. The air traffic control transcripts were released within days of the crash in 1998 and the air traffic control audio was released in May 2007, following a ruling by the Federal Court of Appeal. Several key minutes of the air traffic control audio can be found on the Toronto Star web site.

In 1999, an article in The Wall Street Journal alleged that the pilots disagreed about whether to dump fuel or descend straight to Halifax. Based on internal TSB summaries of the CVR recording, the Journal claimed that co-pilot Löw suggested steps aimed at a quick landing, which were ignored or rejected by Captain Zimmermann. Swissair and Canadian investigators would not comment on the accuracy of the reporting, with a TSB spokesman deeming it "a reporter's interpretation of a summary document of what might have been" on the CVR.

Probable cause 
The Transportation Safety Board of Canada investigation identified eleven causes and contributing factors of the crash in its final report. The first and most prominent was:

Investigators identified evidence of arcing in wiring of the in-flight entertainment network, but this did not trip the circuit breakers, which were not designed to trip on arcing. The investigation was unable to determine whether this arc was the "lead event" that was assumed to have ignited the flammable covering on MPET insulation blankets that quickly spread across other flammable materials. After the crew cut power to "non-essential" cabin systems, a reverse flow in the cockpit ventilation ducts increased the amount of smoke reaching the flight deck. By the time the crew became aware of the severity of the fire, it had become so extensive that it was impossible to address as it happened.

The rapid spread of electrical power failures led to the breakdown of key avionics systems, and the crew was soon rendered unable to control the aircraft. The pilot-in-command was forced to fly manually because he had no light by which to see his controls after the instrument lighting failed. The fuel-laden plane was above maximum landing weight so the flight crew activated dumping of fuel. The pilots lost all control and the doomed plane flew into the ocean uncommanded. Recovered fragments of the plane show that the temperature inside the cockpit became so great that aluminium parts in the flight deck ceiling had melted. Death was instantaneous for all passengers and crew due to the impact forces and deceleration.

Safety recommendations 
The TSB made nine recommendations relating to changes in aircraft materials (testing, certification, inspection, and maintenance), electrical systems, and flight data capture, as both flight recorders had stopped when they lost power six minutes before impact. General recommendations were also made regarding improvements in checklists and in fire-detection and fire-fighting equipment and training. These recommendations have led to widespread changes in Federal Aviation Administration standards, principally affecting wiring and fire hardening.

Conspiracy and alternative theories 
On October 16th, the involvement of British intelligence, through the planting of a magnesium sulfate-based incendiary device in the cockpit, was posited in an article by Executive Intelligence Review in Volume 25 of the magazine. The author, Dean Andromidas, based his assertion on the fact that former MI6 agent Richard Tomlinson had been scheduled to fly on Swissair 111, which was also reported in British tabloid News of the World and confirmed by Tomlinson himself. However, Tomlinson was detained on arrival at JFK Airport after disembarking Flight Swissair 110 from Geneva, thereby preventing him from flying back days later on the ill-fated flight.  Tomlinson had revealed British state secrets and in the months preceding the crash had threatened to reveal more. Andromidas further alleged that a key Swissair safety official involved in the investigation, upon returning to Switzerland, was banned from speaking to the press and even his superiors.  

Unrelated to Andromidas, former RCMP sergeant Tom Juby, who had been part of the Swissair 111 investigation, published a book in 2017 titled "Twice as Far" where he alleged that the TSB suppressed strong evidence for the existence of an incendiary device aboard Swissair 111, such as high levels of magnesium, iron and other elements in the part of the cockpit that burned the strongest. Juby also states that a mechanic who serviced the airplane before the flight had provided fake credentials and had disappeared. Further, Juby claims he was asked by senior RCMP officials to retroactively edit his notes for the public record of the investigation so as to omit any mention of his views on the plausibility of an incendiary device having brought down the flight. Reaction to Juby's book was mostly negative. The TSB would not comment explicitly on Juby's claims, saying that it stood by the findings of its investigation. Juby's allegations were initially featured in an episode of the CBC's The Fifth Estate on September 16th 2011. Swiss television co-produced the episode, but withdrew it from being broadcast in Switzerland citing the speculative nature of Juby's conclusions.  

Other alternative theories pertain to whether the pilots could have landed at Halifax had they not attempted a fuel dump procedure. It has emerged that the Swiss Federal Archives holds records, still in the 50-year statutory protection period, dating from 1998 to 1999 suggesting Swiss Federal Prosecutors had pursued a criminal investigation of possible involuntary homicide (manslaughter) related to the Swissair 111 crash, though it remains unclear who the exact target of the probe was.

Legacy

Lost works 
Two paintings, including Le Peintre (The Painter) by Pablo Picasso, were on board the aircraft and were destroyed in the accident.

Lawsuit 
In September 1999 Swissair, Delta Air Lines, and Boeing (who had acquired McDonnell Douglas through a merger in 1997) agreed to share liability for the accident and offered the families of the passengers financial compensation. The offer was rejected in favour of a $19.8 billion suit against Swissair and DuPont, the supplier of the Mylar insulation sheathing. A US federal court ruled against punitive damages in February 2002. The resulting compensations for one group of plaintiffs totaled over $13 million.

Memorials and tributes 

A non-denominational memorial service was held on the grounds of East St. Margaret's Elementary School in Indian Harbour on 9 September 1998. Among those in attendance were 175 relatives of the crash victims, Swiss president Flavio Cotti, Canadian prime minister Jean Chrétien, and Nova Scotia premier Russell MacLellan. A memorial service was also held in Zürich on 11 September 1998. The following year, another memorial was held in Nova Scotia.

Two memorials to those who died in the crash were established by the Government of Nova Scotia. The second is a more private, but much larger commemoration located west of the crash site near Bayswater Beach Provincial Park on the Aspotogan Peninsula in Bayswater. Here, the unidentified remains of the victims are interred. A fund was established to maintain the memorials and the government passed an act to recognize the memorials. Various other charitable funds were also created, including one in the name of a young victim from Louisiana, Robert Martin Maillet, which provided money for children in need, and one in the name of Robert's mother, Karen E. Maillet-Domingue (also a victim), which granted scholarships.

A further permanent memorial, albeit not publicly accessible, was created inside the operations centre at Zürich Airport where a simple plaque on the ground floor in the centre opening of a spiral staircase pays tribute to the victims.

Aftermath and impacts on the industry 
The crash of Flight 111 was a severe blow to Swissair and the airline suffered even more loss following the crash, particularly as the in-flight entertainment system that was blamed for causing the accident had been installed on the aircraft to attract more passengers and was removed in order to ease the airline's financial difficulties. Swissair later went bankrupt shortly after the September 11 attacks in 2001, an event that caused a significant and widespread disruption to the aviation transportation industry.

After the crash of Flight 111, the flight designator for Swissair's New York–Geneva route was changed to SR139, although the route was still operated by MD-11 aircraft. Following the bankruptcy of Swissair in 2002, their international traffic rights were passed to Crossair who began operating flights as Swiss International Air Lines, changing the flight designator for the New York–Geneva route to LX023. The MD-11 was retired from the Swiss fleet in 2004, and the flight today is operated by Airbus A330-300 aircraft.

In popular culture
 The events of Flight 111 were featured in "Fire on Board", a Season 1 (2003) episode of the Canadian TV series Mayday (called Air Emergency and Air Disasters in the US and Air Crash Investigation in the UK and elsewhere around the world). The dramatization was broadcast in the United States with the title "Fire in the Sky". The flight was also included in a Mayday Season 6 (2007) Science of Disaster special titled "Fatal Flaw", which was called "Fatal Fix" in the United Kingdom, Australia and Asia.
 There have been several other documentaries about Flight 111: an episode of the CBC's The Fifth Estate titled "The Investigation of Swissair 111"; an episode of the CBC's The Nature of Things; an episode of PBS's NOVA titled "Aircrash"; an episode of History Channel's Disasters of the Century; and an episode of National Geographic Channel's Seconds From Disaster.
 It is featured in season 1, episode 4, of the TV show Why Planes Crash, in an episode called "Fire in the Sky".
 The disaster was featured on the Swiss television channel SRF, in a dramatization called Feuer an Bord – Die Tragödie von Swissair Flug 111 (Fire on Board – The Tragedy of Swissair Flight 111).
 The Canadian poet Jacob McArthur Mooney's 2011 collection, Folk, tangentially interrogates the disaster and its effect on Nova Scotia residents.
The Canadian poet Eleonore Schönmaier's poem from her collection Treading Fast Rivers looks at the effect of the crash on a Nova Scotia village.
 The song "TV on 10" from the 2013 album Hokey Fright by The Uncluded describes, on the night of the crash, being in the company of a friend (later revealed to be Blockhead (music producer)) whose mother was aboard the flight.
 The disaster was alluded to in the Chinese film Crash Landing, whose plot mentioned that a business partner of one of the passengers had been killed in the crash of Flight 111.

See also

 Aviation accidents and incidents
 South African Airways Flight 295 – another aviation accident which also crashed due to inflight-fire.

Notes

References

Further reading
 – French version available here

External links

Detailed report about the crash on Austrian Wings (German, published on 2 September 2013)  
Swissair – Information about the accident of SR111– Swissair
Esquire July 2000 report "The Long Fall of One-Eleven Heavy" highlighting the human side of the accident
Lloyd's of London
"Lloyd's statement regarding Swissair crash site license application." Friday 19 May 2000. (Archive)
"Lloyd's statement regarding the Swissair crash site." Tuesday 23 May 2000. (Archive)
Cockpit Voice Recorder transcript and accident summary on tailstrike.com 
Swissair Flight 111 memorial site (Archive)
Swissair profile CNN
Swissair crash warning to airlines, BBC

111
Aviation accidents and incidents in 1998
Airliner accidents and incidents in Canada
Disasters in Nova Scotia
History of Halifax, Nova Scotia
Lunenburg County, Nova Scotia
1998 in Switzerland
Airliner accidents and incidents caused by in-flight fires
1998 disasters in Canada
Canada–Switzerland relations
Marine salvage operations
Accidents and incidents involving the McDonnell Douglas MD-11
1998 fires in North America
1998 in Nova Scotia
September 1998 events in North America
Halifax Stanfield International Airport